AS Trenčín is a Slovak sports club in the town of Trenčín, most known for its football department. The first team currently plays in the Fortuna Liga after winning the 2010–11 Slovak First League. The club plays its home games at the Štadión na Sihoti with a capacity of 10,000 spectators.

History
The football team was established in 1990 as TJ Ozeta Dukla Trenčín and started in the third division of the Czechoslovak competition, finishing one place below TTS Trenčín. Afterwards both clubs merged. Later, the club spent three seasons (1994–97) in the second division in Slovakia. Since 1997, Trenčín has continuously played in the Slovak first division.

In 2002 the club changed its name to FK Laugaricio Trenčín, and one year later became FK AS Trenčín (Araver a Synot Trenčín).

The club's biggest success so far was winning the national title in the 2014–15 season and reaching second place in the 2013–14 season. Trenčín has also made four appearances in the Intertoto Cup (1998, 1999, 2000 and 2002). It is owned by former Dutch international Tschen La Ling. After 11 seasons in the top level the club was relegated after the 2007–08 season.

In July 2015, FK AS Trenčín together with women's handball team HK Štart Trenčín was merged into Asociácia športov Trenčín.

Events timeline
 1992: Founded as TJ Ozeta Dukla Trenčín
 1995: Renamed FK Ozeta Dukla Trenčín
 2002: Renamed Laugaricio Trenčín
 2003: Renamed FK AS Trenčín (Araver a Synot Trenčín)
 2015: Renamed AS Trenčín (Asociácia športov Trenčín)

Honours

Domestic
 Czechoslovakia
 Czechoslovak First League (1925–93)
  Runners-up (1): 1962–63 1
  Third place (1): 1967–68 1
 Slovakia
 Slovak League  (1993–present)
  Winners (2): 2014–15, 2015–16
  Runners-up (1): 2013–14
 Slovak Cup  (1961–present)
  Winners (3): 19781, 2014–15, 2015–16
 Slovakian Second Division (1993–present)
  Winners (1): 2010–11

1 – As Jednota Trenčín

Czechoslovak and Slovak Top Goalscorer
The Czechoslovak League top scorer from 1944 to 1945 until 1992–93. Since the 1993–94 Slovak League Top scorer.

1Shared award

European
 Mitropa Cup
  Runners-up (1): 1966 1
1 – As Jednota Trenčín

UEFA ranking
This is the current 2022–23 (November 3) UEFA coefficient:

Full list

Affiliated clubs
The following clubs are affiliated with AS Trenčín:
  TONEGIDO (2007–08)
  Baník Horná Nitra (2011–present)
  Slovan Nemšová (2012–present)
  Ajax (2012–present)
  AGOVV Apeldoorn (2012–13)
  GBS Academy (2014–2019)
  FK Inter Bratislava (2016–present)

Supporters
The club has a fairly large support in the country and have an active ultras group. They have a fierce rivalry with Spartak Trnava and Slovan Bratislava. The club is one of the very few in the region with politically left-wing fans. Trenčín supporters maintain friendly relations with some fans of Czech Bohemians 1905.

Sponsorship

Club partners

van Styn
FITSHAPE
McDonald's
City of Trenčín
VRM

Vaillant
Mercedes-Benz Motor-Car Trenčín
Corgoň
Noba
RAUCH

Party Partners
SWAN
MM Transpend
EDART
machunka.sk

Current squad
As of 8 February 2023

For recent transfers, see List of Slovak football transfers winter 2022-23.

Out on loan

Managers

Current technical staff
As of 22 January 2023

Transfers
AS have produced numerous players who have gone on to represent the Slovak national football team. Over the last period there has been a steady increase of young players leaving Trenčín after a few years of first team football and moving on to play football in leagues of a higher standard, with the Russian Football Premier League (Martin Škrteľ to Zenit in 2004, František Kubík to Kuban in 2011), Belgian Pro League (Moses Simon, Haris Hajradinović (booth 2014), Rabiu Ibrahim (2016), Samuel Kalu (2017), Rangelo Janga (2018), Philip Azango (2018), Reuben Yem (2019) and Osman Bukari (2020) to K.A.A. Gent, Wesley to Club Brugge in 2016, Kingsley Madu and Aliko Bala to Zulte Waregem in 2016,2017 James Lawrence to Anderlecht in 2018), Danish Superliga (Stanislav Lobotka and Ramón to FC Nordsjælland in 2015, Fanendo Adi to Copenhagen in 2013), Dutch Eredivisie (Ryan Koolwijk to SBV Excelsior in 2016, Hilary Gong to SBV Vitesse in 2018), Greece Superleague (Jairo to PAOK in 2015), Norway Tippeligaen (Tomáš Malec to Lillestrøm SK in 2016), Czech First League (Aldo Baéz to Slavia Prague in 2014 and season 2015–16 league topscorer Gino van Kessel in 2016). The top transfer was agreed in 2016 when 20 years old talented winger Wesley joined Belgian Club Brugge for a fee €4.2 million.

Record transfers

*-unofficial fee

Results

League and Cup history
Slovak League only (1993–present)

{|class="wikitable"
|- style="background:#efefef;"
 ! style="color:white; background:red;"| Season
 ! style="color:white; background:red;"| Division (Name)
 ! style="color:white; background:red;"| Pos./Teams
 ! style="color:white; background:red;"| Pl.
 ! style="color:white; background:red;"| W
 ! style="color:white; background:red;"| D
 ! style="color:white; background:red;"| L
 ! style="color:white; background:red;"| GS
 ! style="color:white; background:red;"| GA
 ! style="color:white; background:red;"| P
 ! style="color:white; background:red;"|Domestic Cup
 ! style="color:white; background:red;" colspan=2|Europe
 ! style="color:white; background:red;"|Top Scorer (Goals)
|-
|align=center|1993–94
|align=center|3rd (3. Liga Západ)
|  style="text-align:center; background:green;"|1/(16)
|align=center|30
|align=center|21
|align=center|6
|align=center|3
|align=center|62
|align=center|19
|align=center|48
|align=center|3R
|align=center|
|align=center|
|align=center|
|-
|align=center|1994–95
|align=center|2nd (1. Liga)
|align=center|7/(16)
|align=center|30
|align=center|13
|align=center|5
|align=center|12
|align=center|54
|align=center|40
|align=center|44
|align=center|1R
|align=center|
|align=center|
|align=center| Róbert Formanko (16)
|-
|align=center|1995–96
|align=center|2nd (1. Liga)
|align=center|9/(16)
|align=center|30
|align=center|10
|align=center|7
|align=center|13
|align=center|41
|align=center|42
|align=center|37
|align=center|1R
|align=center|
|align=center|
|align=center|
|-
|align=center|1996–97
|align=center|2nd (1. Liga)
|  style="text-align:center; background:green;"|2/(18)
|align=center|34
|align=center|24
|align=center|2
|align=center|8
|align=center|68
|align=center|30
|align=center|74
|align=center|1R
|align=center|
|align=center|
|align=center|
|-
|align=center|1997–98
|align=center|1st (Mars Superliga)
|align=center|4/(16)
|align=center|30
|align=center|14
|align=center|5
|align=center|9
|align=center|47
|align=center|31
|align=center|53
|align=center|2R
|align=center|
|align=center|
|align=center|  Martin Fabuš (16)
|-
|align=center|1998–99
|align=center|1st (Mars Superliga)
|align=center|5/(16)
|align=center|30
|align=center|15
|align=center|8
|align=center|7
|align=center|53
|align=center|25
|align=center|53
|align=center|1R
|align=center|UI
|align=center|2R ( Baltika)
|align=center|  Martin Fabuš (19)
|-
|align=center|1999–00
|align=center|1st (Mars Superliga)
|align=center|5/(16)
|align=center|30
|align=center|13
|align=center|8
|align=center|9
|align=center|38
|align=center|29
|align=center|47
|align=center|2R
|align=center|UI
|align=center|1R ( Pobeda)
|align=center|  Jozef Valachovič (7)
|-
|align=center|2000–01
|align=center|1st (Mars Superliga)
|align=center|8/(10)
|align=center|36
|align=center|11
|align=center|6
|align=center|19
|align=center|35
|align=center|59
|align=center|39
|align=center|2R
|align=center|UI
|align=center| 1.R ( Dinaburg)
|align=center|  Marián Klago (6)
|-
|align=center|2001–02
|align=center|1st (Mars Superliga)
|align=center|5/(10)
|align=center|36
|align=center|15
|align=center|9
|align=center|12
|align=center|45
|align=center|43
|align=center|54
|align=center|2R
|align=center|
|align=center|
|align=center|  Martin Fabuš (9)
|-
|align=center|2002–03
|align=center|1st (Superliga)
|align=center|9/(10)
|align=center|36
|align=center|11
|align=center|5
|align=center|20
|align=center|48
|align=center|69
|align=center|38
|align=center|2R
|align=center|UI
|align=center|1R ( Slaven Belupo)
|align=center| Milan Ivana (10)
|-
|align=center|2003–04
|align=center|1st (Corgoň Liga)
|align=center|5/(10)
|align=center|36
|align=center|13
|align=center|9
|align=center|14
|align=center|37
|align=center|43
|align=center|48
|align=center|1R
|align=center|
|align=center|
|align=center| Stanislav Velický (7)
|-
|align=center|2004–05
|align=center|1st (Corgoň Liga)
|align=center|8/(10)
|align=center|36
|align=center|12
|align=center|7
|align=center|17
|align=center|36
|align=center|50
|align=center|43
|align=center|2R
|align=center|
|align=center|
|align=center|  Ivan Lietava (9)
|-
|align=center|2005–06
|align=center|1st (Corgoň Liga)
|align=center|7/(10)
|align=center|36
|align=center|11
|align=center|9
|align=center|16
|align=center|31
|align=center|49
|align=center|42
|align=center|Quarter-finals
|align=center|
|align=center|
|align=center|  Jaroslav Kamenský (6)
|-
|align=center|2006–07
|align=center|1st (Corgoň Liga)
|align=center|11/(12)
|align=center|36
|align=center|8
|align=center|11
|align=center|17
|align=center|31
|align=center|49
|align=center|35
|align=center|2R
|align=center|
|align=center|
|align=center|  Juraj Czinege (4)
|-
|align=center|2007–08
|align=center|1st (Corgoň Liga)
|  style="text-align:center; background:red;"|12/(12)
|align=center|33
|align=center|3
|align=center|7
|align=center|23
|align=center|26
|align=center|77
|align=center|16
|align=center|3R
|align=center|
|align=center|
|align=center|  David Depetris (4)
|-
|align=center|2008–09
|align=center|2nd (1. liga)
|  style="text-align:center; "|2/(12)
|align=center|33
|align=center|19
|align=center|9
|align=center|5
|align=center|74
|align=center|27
|align=center|66
|align=center|1R
|align=center|
|align=center|
|align=center|  David Depetris (21)
|-
|align=center|2009–10
|align=center|2nd (1. liga)
|  style="text-align:center; "|2/(12)
|align=center|27
|align=center|13
|align=center|11
|align=center|3
|align=center|53
|align=center|21
|align=center|50
|align=center|3R
|align=center|
|align=center|
|align=center|  Filip Hlohovský (7)   Jorge Salinas (7)
|-
|align=center|2010–11
|align=center|2nd (1. liga)
|  style="text-align:center; background:green;"|1/(12)
|align=center|33
|align=center|22
|align=center|6
|align=center|5
|align=center|77
|align=center|30
|align=center|72
|align=center|3R
|align=center|
|align=center|
|align=center|  David Depetris (31)
|-
|align=center|2011–12
|align=center|1st (Corgoň Liga)
|align=center|5/(12)
|align=center|33
|align=center|12
|align=center|12
|align=center|9
|align=center|51
|align=center|49
|align=center|48
|align=center|3R
|align=center|
|align=center|
|align=center|  Lester Peltier (11)
|-
|align=center|2012–13
|align=center|1st (Corgoň Liga)
|  style="text-align:center; background:tan;"|3/(12)
|align=center|33
|align=center|14
|align=center|11
|align=center|8
|align=center|52
|align=center|34
|align=center|18
|align=center|3R
|align=center|
|align=center|
|align=center|  David Depetris (16)
|-
|align=center|2013–14
|align=center|1st (Corgoň Liga)
|  style="text-align:center; background:silver;"|2/(12)
|align=center|33
|align=center|19
|align=center|6
|align=center|8
|align=center|74
|align=center|35
|align=center|63
|align=center|2R
|align=center|EL
|align=center|Q3 ( Astra)
|align=center|  Tomáš Malec (14)
|-
|align=center|2014–15
|align=center|1st (Fortuna Liga)
|  style="text-align:center; background:gold;"|1/(12)
|align=center|33
|align=center|23
|align=center|5
|align=center|5
|align=center|67
|align=center|28
|align=center|74
|  style="text-align:center; background:gold;"|Winner
|align=center| EL
|align=center|Q3 ( Hull City)
|align=center|  Jairo (8)
|-
|align=center|2015–16
|align=center|1st (Fortuna Liga)
|  style="text-align:center; background:gold;"|1/(12)
|align=center|33
|align=center|26
|align=center|3
|align=center|4
|align=center|73
|align=center|28
|align=center|81
|  style="text-align:center; background:gold;"|Winner
|align=center| CL
|align=center|Q2 ( Steaua București)
|align=center|  Gino van Kessel (17)
|-
|align=center|2016–17
|align=center|1st (Fortuna Liga)
|align=center|4/(12)
|align=center|30
|align=center|14
|align=center|5
|align=center|11
|align=center|53
|align=center|48
|align=center|47
|align=center|Quarter-finals
|align=center| CL  EL
|align=center| Q3 ( Legia Warsaw)  PO ( Rapid Wien)
|align=center|  Rangelo Janga (14)
|-
|align=center|2017–18
|align=center|1st (Fortuna Liga)
|align=center|5/(12)
|align=center|31
|align=center|14
|align=center|6
|align=center|11
|align=center|73
|align=center|47
|align=center|48
|align=center|4R
|align=center| EL
|align=center| Q2 ( Bnei Yehuda) 
|align=center|  Rangelo Janga (14)
|-
|align=center|2018–19
|align=center|1st (Fortuna Liga)
|align=center|11/(12)
|align=center|32
|align=center|8
|align=center|7
|align=center|17
|align=center|41
|align=center|56
|align=center|31
|align=center|6R
|align=center| EL
|align=center| PO ( AEK Larnaca) 
|align=center| Hamza Čataković (12)
|-
|align=center|2019–20
|align=center|1st (Fortuna Liga)
|align=center|7/(12)
|align=center|27
|align=center|11
|align=center|6
|align=center|10
|align=center|52
|align=center|43
|align=center|39
|align=center|Quarter-finals
|align=center| 
|align=center| 
|align=center| Osman Bukari (10)
|-
|align=center|2020–21
|align=center|1st (Fortuna Liga)
|align=center| 6/(12)
|align=center|32
|align=center|8
|align=center|8
|align=center|16
|align=center|42
|align=center|61
|align=center|32
|align=center|Quarter-finals
|align=center| 
|align=center| 
|align=center| Hamza Čataković (12)
|-
|align=center|2021–22
|align=center|1st (Fortuna Liga)
|align=center| 7/(12)
|align=center|32
|align=center|13
|align=center|9
|align=center|10
|align=center|58
|align=center|43
|align=center|48
|align=center|Semi-finals
|align=center| 
|align=center| 
|align=center| Jakub Kadák (13)
|}

European competition history
 Until 1992 played as Jednota Trenčín

Player records

Most goals

Players whose name is listed in bold are still active.

Notable players
Had international caps for their respective countries. Players whose name is listed in bold represented their countries while playing for AS Trenčín.

Managers

  Ján Hucko (1975-76)
  Ladislav Kuna (1995–96)
  Stanislav Griga (1 Jul 1996 – 30 Jun 1998)
  Ladislav Borbély (1997-98)
  Róbert Paldan (1998–00)
  Alexander Bokij (2000–01)
  Milan Albrecht (2001)
  Anton Dragúň (2001)
  Róbert Paldan (2002)
  Anton Dragúň (2002-2003)
  Jaroslav Jurkovič (2003)
  Karol Kisel st. (2003–04)
  Anton Jánoš (2004–05)
  Karol Marko (2005)
  Ladislav Hudec (1 Jul 2005 – 11 Mar 2006)
  Vlastimil Palička (2006–07)
  Rob McDonald (1 Jul 2007 – 30 Jun 2008)
  Martin Stano (2008)
  Ivan Galád (2008–09)
  Vladimír Koník (1 Jul 2009 – 13 Nov 2009)
  Adrián Guľa (14 Nov 2009 – 30 Jun 2013)
  Ľubomír Nosický (1 Jul 2013 – 8 Sep 2013)
  Martin Ševela (8 Sep 2013 – 12 Sep 2017)
  Vladimír Cifranič (12 Sep 2017 – 2 Jun 2018)
  Ricardo Moniz (2 Jun 2018 – 28 Oct 2018)
  Vladimír Cifranič (28 Oct 2018 – 20 Mar 2019)
  Matthias Kohler (20 Mar 2019 – 7 May 2019)
  Ivan Galád (7 May 2019 – 20 Jun 2019)
  Matthias Kohler (20 Jun 2019 – 22 Oct 2019)
  Norbert Hrnčár (22 Oct 2019 – 30 Jun 2020)
  Stijn Vreven (17 Jul 2020 – 27 Apr 2021)
  Juraj Ančic (27 Apr 2021 – 2 Jun 2021) (car.)
  Peter Hlinka (2 June 2021 – 5 Dec 2021)
  Juraj Ančic (21 Dec 2021 – 6 Jun 2022)
  Peter Hyballa (12 Jun 2022 – 27 Jul 2022)
  Marián Zimen (28 Jul 2022 – present)

Previous kits

References

External links 

 Official website 

 
Trenčín
Trencin
Trencin
1992 establishments in Slovakia
Sport in Trenčín Region